Arabi may refer to:

Ibn Arabi (1165–1240), early medieval Muslim mystic and philosopher
Arabi (sheep)
Arabi, Iran (disambiguation), villages in Iran
Arabi, Ethiopia
Arabi, Georgia, United States
Ahmed ‘Urabi, a 19th-century Egyptian rebel and patriot
Arabi, Louisiana, United States, named for him
Arabi Island, Saudi Arabia

See also
 Al-Arabi (disambiguation)
 Araby (disambiguation)
 Arabic (disambiguation)